Progress is the name of several inhabited localities in Russia.

Modern localities

Republic of Adygea
As of 2012, one rural locality in the Republic of Adygea bears this name:
Progress, Republic of Adygea, a khutor in Giaginsky District;

Amur Oblast
As of 2012, one urban locality in Amur Oblast bears this name:
Progress, Amur Oblast, a work settlement; administratively incorporated as an urban okrug

Republic of Bashkortostan
As of 2012, three rural localities in the Republic of Bashkortostan bear this name:
Progress, Bizhbulyaksky District, Republic of Bashkortostan, a village in Kamensky Selsoviet of Bizhbulyaksky District; 
Progress, Kugarchinsky District, Republic of Bashkortostan, a khutor in Tlyaumbetovsky Selsoviet of Kugarchinsky District; 
Progress, Yanaulsky District, Republic of Bashkortostan, a selo in Kisak-Kainsky Selsoviet of Yanaulsky District;

Bryansk Oblast
As of 2012, five rural localities in Bryansk Oblast bear this name:
Progress, Klimovsky District, Bryansk Oblast, a settlement in Novoropsky Rural Administrative Okrug of Klimovsky District; 
Progress, Komarichsky District, Bryansk Oblast, a settlement in Litizhsky Rural Administrative Okrug of Komarichsky District; 
Progress, Mglinsky District, Bryansk Oblast, a settlement in Vysoksky Rural Administrative Okrug of Mglinsky District; 
Progress, Pochepsky District, Bryansk Oblast, a settlement in Valuyetsky Rural Administrative Okrug of Pochepsky District; 
Progress, Trubchevsky District, Bryansk Oblast, a settlement in Teletsky Rural Administrative Okrug of Trubchevsky District;

Kabardino-Balkar Republic
As of 2012, one rural locality in the Kabardino-Balkar Republic bears this name:
Progress, Kabardino-Balkar Republic, a selo in Prokhladnensky District;

Kaliningrad Oblast
As of 2012, one rural locality in Kaliningrad Oblast bears this name:
Progress, Kaliningrad Oblast, a settlement under the administrative jurisdiction of the town of district significance of Pravdinsk in Pravdinsky District

Kaluga Oblast
As of 2012, two rural localities in Kaluga Oblast bear this name:
Progress, Khvastovichsky District, Kaluga Oblast, a selo in Khvastovichsky District
Progress, Kuybyshevsky District, Kaluga Oblast, a village in Kuybyshevsky District

Kemerovo Oblast
As of 2012, one rural locality in Kemerovo Oblast bears this name:
Progress, Kemerovo Oblast, a village in Vaganovskaya Rural Territory of Promyshlennovsky District;

Krasnodar Krai
As of 2012, four rural localities in Krasnodar Krai bear this name:
Progress, Sochi, Krasnodar Krai, a selo in Razdolsky Rural Okrug under the administrative jurisdiction of Khostinsky City District of the City of Sochi; 
Progress, Gulkevichsky District, Krasnodar Krai, a khutor in Otrado-Kubansky Rural Okrug of Gulkevichsky District; 
Progress, Novokubansky District, Krasnodar Krai, a settlement in Kovalevsky Rural Okrug of Novokubansky District; 
Progress, Temryuksky District, Krasnodar Krai, a settlement in Novotamansky Rural Okrug of Temryuksky District;

Krasnoyarsk Krai
As of 2012, one rural locality in Krasnoyarsk Krai bears this name:
Progress, Krasnoyarsk Krai, a village in Glyadensky Selsoviet of Nazarovsky District

Kurgan Oblast
As of 2012, one rural locality in Kurgan Oblast bears this name:
Progress, Kurgan Oblast, a selo in Klyuchevskoy Selsoviet of Shadrinsky District;

Nizhny Novgorod Oblast
As of 2012, one rural locality in Nizhny Novgorod Oblast bears this name:
Progress, Nizhny Novgorod Oblast, a settlement in Permeyevsky Selsoviet of Bolsheboldinsky District;

Novgorod Oblast
As of 2012, one rural locality in Novgorod Oblast bears this name:
Progress, Novgorod Oblast, a settlement in Progresskoye Settlement of Borovichsky District

Novosibirsk Oblast
As of 2012, one rural locality in Novosibirsk Oblast bears this name:
Progress, Novosibirsk Oblast, a settlement in Novosibirsky District;

Oryol Oblast
As of 2012, four rural localities in Oryol Oblast bear this name:
Progress (rural locality), Podgorodnensky Selsoviet, Maloarkhangelsky District, Oryol Oblast, a settlement in Podgorodnensky Selsoviet of Maloarkhangelsky District; 
Progress (rural locality), Podgorodnensky Selsoviet, Maloarkhangelsky District, Oryol Oblast, a village in Podgorodnensky Selsoviet of Maloarkhangelsky District; 
Progress, Mtsensky District, Oryol Oblast, a settlement in Vysokinsky Selsoviet of Mtsensky District; 
Progress, Uritsky District, Oryol Oblast, a settlement in Lunacharsky Selsoviet of Uritsky District;

Penza Oblast
As of 2012, one rural locality in Penza Oblast bears this name:
Progress, Penza Oblast, a selo in Makhalinsky Selsoviet of Kuznetsky District

Rostov Oblast
As of 2012, four rural localities in Rostov Oblast bear this name:
Progress, Salsky District, Rostov Oblast, a settlement in Rybasovskoye Rural Settlement of Salsky District; 
Progress, Vesyolovsky District, Rostov Oblast, a khutor in Krasnooktyabrskoye Rural Settlement of Vesyolovsky District; 
Progress, Volgodonskoy District, Rostov Oblast, a settlement in Progressovskoye Rural Settlement of Volgodonskoy District; 
Progress, Yegorlyksky District, Rostov Oblast, a khutor in Yegorlykskoye Rural Settlement of Yegorlyksky District;

Ryazan Oblast
As of 2012, one rural locality in Ryazan Oblast bears this name:
Progress, Ryazan Oblast, a settlement in Troitsky Rural Okrug of Sarayevsky District

Samara Oblast
As of 2012, one rural locality in Samara Oblast bears this name:
Progress, Samara Oblast, a settlement in Khvorostyansky District

Saratov Oblast
As of 2012, one rural locality in Saratov Oblast bears this name:
Progress, Saratov Oblast, a settlement in Ivanteyevsky District

Smolensk Oblast
As of 2012, one rural locality in Smolensk Oblast bears this name:
Progress, Smolensk Oblast, a village in Tumanovskoye Rural Settlement of Vyazemsky District

Stavropol Krai
As of 2012, three rural localities in Stavropol Krai bear this name:
Progress, Budyonnovsky District, Stavropol Krai, a settlement in Iskrovsky Selsoviet of Budyonnovsky District
Progress, Kirovsky District, Stavropol Krai, a settlement in Zolsky Selsoviet of Kirovsky District
Progress, Kochubeyevsky District, Stavropol Krai, a khutor in Novoderevensky Selsoviet of Kochubeyevsky District

Sverdlovsk Oblast
As of 2012, one rural locality in Sverdlovsk Oblast bears this name:
Progress, Sverdlovsk Oblast, a settlement under the administrative jurisdiction of the City of Pervouralsk

Tambov Oblast
As of 2012, two rural localities in Tambov Oblast bear this name:
Progress, Uvarovsky District, Tambov Oblast, a settlement in Berezovsky Selsoviet of Uvarovsky District
Progress, Znamensky District, Tambov Oblast, a village in Pokrovo-Marfinsky Selsoviet of Znamensky District

Republic of Tatarstan
As of 2012, one rural locality in the Republic of Tatarstan bears this name:
Progress, Republic of Tatarstan, a settlement in Bugulminsky District

Tula Oblast
As of 2012, one rural locality in Tula Oblast bears this name:
Progress, Tula Oblast, a settlement in Bogucharovsky Rural Okrug of Kireyevsky District

Tyumen Oblast
As of 2012, one rural locality in Tyumen Oblast bears this name:
Progress, Tyumen Oblast, a village in Pamyatninsky Rural Okrug of Yalutorovsky District

Vologda Oblast
As of 2012, one rural locality in Vologda Oblast bears this name:
Progress, Vologda Oblast, a village in Nikolsky Selsoviet of Sheksninsky District

Voronezh Oblast
As of 2012, one rural locality in Voronezh Oblast bears this name:
Progress, Voronezh Oblast, a settlement in Rubashevskoye Rural Settlement of Anninsky District

Alternative names
Progress, alternative name of Elvg, a settlement in Elvginskaya Rural Administration of Yashkulsky District in the Republic of Kalmykia;

See also

 Progress (spacecraft), a Russian, formerly Soviet, cargo spacecapsule